Jászfelsőszentgyörgy is a village in Jász-Nagykun-Szolnok county, in the Northern Great Plain region of central Hungary.

Geography
It lies on the right side of the Zagyva river in the Jász-Nagykun-Szolnok county's northwestern region.

Public Life
Mayors
 1990–1994: Ménkű Miklós (independent)  
 1994–1998: Ménkű Miklós (independent) 
 1998–2002: Ménkű Miklós (independent) 
 2002–2006: Rimóczi Sándor (independent) 
 2006–2010: Zelenai Tibor Károlyné (independent) 
 2010–2014: Zelenai Tibor Károlyné (independent) 
 2014–2019: Zelenai Tibor Károlyné (independent) 
 2019-present: Zelenai Tibor Károlyné (Fidesz-KDNP)

Population

Trivia 
Jászfelsőszentgyörgy is the longest name of a city or village in Hungary.

References

External links
 Official site in Hungarian

Populated places in Jász-Nagykun-Szolnok County
Jászság